Aziz Abbes Mouhiidine is an Italian amateur boxer. He participated at the 2021 AIBA World Boxing Championships, being awarded the silver medal in the heavyweight event. Abbes Mouhiidine also participated at the 2022 European Amateur Boxing Championships, being awarded the gold medal in the heavyweight event.

References

External links 

Living people
Place of birth missing (living people)
Year of birth missing (living people)
Italian male boxers
Heavyweight boxers
AIBA World Boxing Championships medalists
Mediterranean Games gold medalists for Italy
Mediterranean Games medalists in boxing
Competitors at the 2018 Mediterranean Games
Competitors at the 2022 Mediterranean Games
21st-century Italian people